Celaenorrhinus illustris, commonly known as the illustrious sprite, is a species of butterfly in the family Hesperiidae. It is found in Nigeria, Cameroon, Equatorial Guinea, Gabon, the Republic of the Congo, the Central African Republic, the Democratic Republic of the Congo and Uganda. The habitat consists of forests.

Subspecies
Celaenorrhinus illustris illustris (eastern Nigeria, Cameroon, Equatorial Guinea, Gabon, Congo, Central African Republic, Democratic Republic of the Congo)
Celaenorrhinus illustris daroa Evans, 1937 (western Uganda)

References

Butterflies described in 1891
illustris
Butterflies of Africa